Guðmundur Agust Kristjánsson (born 7 October 1992) is an Icelandic professional golfer and European Tour player.

Early life and amateur career
Kristjánsson grew up in Reykjavík, Iceland. He won the Icelandic Junior Matchplay Championship in 2005, 2007, 2008, and 2009, and in 2005, 2006, 2008 and 2010 he won the Icelandic Junior Strokeplay Championship. 

He played his first event abroad in 2007 when he was 14, and three years later he won the Duke of York Young Champions Trophy at Royal St George's Golf Club in England.

Kristjánsson attended college at East Tennessee State University between 2012 and 2016, and played golf with the East Tennessee State Buccaneers men's golf team. He roomed with Adrian Meronk and won multiple times, and represented the school in the NCAA National Championship. He turned professional after graduating with a degree in Physics in 2016.

Professional career
Kristjánsson joined the Nordic Golf League in 2017. In 2019 he won three events and earned promotion to the Challenge Tour.

In his rookie year on the Challenge Tour, he finished fifth at the Northern Ireland Open, and became the highest ranked Icelandic golfer on the Official World Golf Ranking, as he overtook Haraldur Magnús. 

In 2022, he tied for 3rd at the Vierumäki Finnish Challenge. He also came through the European Tour Qualifying School to earn a spot on the European Tour for 2023.

Amateur wins
2005 Icelandic Junior Strokeplay Championship, Icelandic Junior Matchplay Championship
2006 Icelandic Junior Strokeplay Championship
2007 Icelandic Junior Matchplay Championship
2008 Icelandic Junior Strokeplay Championship, Icelandic Junior Matchplay Championship
2009 Icelandic Junior Matchplay Championship
2010 Icelandic Junior Strokeplay Championship, Duke of York Young Champions Trophy
2013 Icelandic Matchplay Championship
2015 Seminole Intercollegiate

Source:

Professional wins (3)

Nordic Golf League wins (3)

*Christensen and Kristjánsson agreed to share the 2019 PGA Championship (NGL) after unsafe conditions caused play to halt after four holes of a playoff.

Team appearances
Amateur
European Amateur Team Championship (representing Iceland): 2011, 2014
Eisenhower Trophy (representing Iceland): 2016

Source:

See also
 2022 European Tour Qualifying School graduates

References

External links
 
 

Icelandic male golfers
European Tour golfers
East Tennessee State Buccaneers men's golfers
Sportspeople from Reykjavík
1992 births
Living people